The Claddagh Palace cinema, originally called the Estoria, opened its doors in 1939, and was located in Lower Salthill in Galway, Ireland. The cinema closed in 1995, and was redeveloped as an apartment complex. The last movie to be shown at the Claddagh Palace was Waterworld.

The Claddagh Palace played host to the Galway Film Fleadh from its inception in 1989, until 1995, when the fleadh relocated to the Town Hall Theatre.

A short documentary entitled Palace of Dreams was made in 1996, looking at the life and times of the cinema as seen and narrated by many of the people involved in its upkeep.

The cinema is also notable for a busker named Terry Smith who played guitar outside the cinema in the 1970s, as people queued to buy tickets.

References

External links
 Galway Film Fleadh
 Hawkeye Films, producers of the Palace of Dreams documentary

Buildings and structures in Galway (city)
Culture in Galway (city)
History of Galway (city)